The Red Line is a rapid transit line in the MARTA rail system. It operates between North Springs and Airport stations, running through Sandy Springs, Dunwoody, Atlanta, East Point and College Park.

The Red Line was originally called the North-South Line until MARTA switched to a color-based naming system in October 2009.  The North-South Line, from its launch, was considered one line, denoted with an orange color on old system maps until 2006 when the North Branch and the Northeast branch were redesignated as the North-South Line (the current Red Line) and the Northeast-South Line (the current Gold Line).  Using the Five Points station as a reference point, the North Line was designated for trips headed for North Springs, and the South Line was designated for trips headed for the Airport.

The rail line was part of the launch of MARTA north–south rail service in 1981.  The first segment ran from the Garnett to the North Avenue stations, although the Peachtree Center opened the year after as an infill.  In 1982, it expanded north to Arts Center, and in 1984, expanded as far north as Brookhaven and as far south as Lakewood/Fort McPherson.  The East Point station opened, extending the line two miles to the south.  A little more than a year later, the Chamblee station began service and served as the temporary terminus of the North Line.  In 1988, the Airport station opened, and became the terminus of the South Line.  In 1992, the North-South Line was extended northward to its current terminus at Doraville.  In 1996, MARTA extended North Line services to Dunwoody.  This created two branches of the North Line, and the Doraville branch was redesignated as the Northeast Line to avoid confusion.  It finally extended north to its current terminus at North Springs in 2000.

Now known as the Red Line, it shares trackage with its counterpart, the Gold Line, between Airport and just north of the Lindbergh Center.

On weekdays, after 8:30 pm, Red Line shuttle train service operates between North Springs and Lindbergh Center stations only until the end of the service. On Saturdays and Sundays, Red Line shuttle train service operates between North Springs and Lindbergh Center stations only from 8:50 pm until the end of the service. When major single tracking occurs, Red Line train service operates between North Springs and Lindbergh Center stations only.

Line description
The Red Line runs above ground, at-grade and below ground in various portions of its route.  It begins at the northern terminus, the North Springs station in Sandy Springs.  The non-revenue tracks extend northward from the station.  It then goes southward paralleling GA 400 (Turner McDonald Parkway) before turning southeast to Dunwoody, then turning south to cross over I-285, then west before running south in the GA 400 median.  In Buckhead, it crosses under the Gold Line before joining the Gold Line, going southwest paralleling I-85.  It turns south through Midtown and enters downtown Atlanta, where it meets the Blue and Green Lines at Five Points station.  Leaving downtown, the Red Line continues south, paralleling Lee Street and Main Street into East Point and College Park before reaching its terminus at the Airport station.

Stations
listed from north to south

Note:  The east–west (now Blue/Green Line) platform opened in 1979.

External links

 Red Line overview
 Red Line schedule

 
Atlanta
Railway lines opened in 1996
Railway lines in highway medians
1996 establishments in Georgia (U.S. state)